Carpathica calophana is a species of air-breathing land snail, a terrestrial pulmonate gastropod mollusk in the family Oxychilidae.

Distribution 
The distribution of this species is eastern-carpathian.

It occurs in:
 Slovakia
 Ukraine

References

Oxychilidae
Gastropods described in 1881